Ganzi is a town in the Ogooué-Ivindo province of Gabon.

Populated places in Ogooué-Ivindo Province